Department of External Territories may refer to:

 Department of External Territories (1941–51), an Australian government department
 Department of External Territories (1968–73), an Australian government department